Phyllostachys virella is a hardy running bamboo with culms that grow thick relative to its height with a subtle scent suggestive of sandalwood.

Description
This bamboo grows with an expected height to 9 m (30 ft) with a culm diameter to 5 cm (2 in).
New culms are green, paling with age, with all green internodes that later develop white powdery rings at maturity.
Culm sheath colors appear grey-green with burgundy or purple margins with larger sheaths sparsely strewn with small spots.
Similar to Phyllostachys atrovaginata, rubbing the culms of this bamboo may release an aroma reminiscent of sandalwood.

Distribution
This bamboo grows in areas ranging from subtropical to temperate and tolerates winter low temperatures better than most bamboos.
Its natural distribution in China is found in Zhejiang Province.

Name
Its common name of "green skin bamboo" or "Dongyang green skin bamboo"
translates directly from the Chinese name, Dongyang being a city-level county in the central area of Zhejiang Province.

References

virella
Flora of Zhejiang
Grasses of China